Statistics of Czechoslovak First League in the 1947–48 season.

Overview
It was contested by 11 teams, and Sparta Prague won the championship. Jaroslav Cejp was the league's top scorer with 21 goals.

Stadia and locations

League standings

Results

Top goalscorers

References

Czechoslovakia - List of final tables (RSSSF)

Czechoslovak First League seasons
Czechoslovak First League, 1947-48
1947–48 in Czechoslovak football